The 2015 season was Stjarnan's 13th season in Úrvalsdeild and their 7th consecutive season.

Rúnar Páll Sigmundsson head coached the team for the second season running. He was assisted by Brynjar Björn Gunnarsson.

Stjarnan came into the season as league champions after winning their first league title in 2014, going unbeaten in the league.

Along with Úrvalsdeild, Stjarnan competed in the Meistarakeppni KSÍ, the Lengjubikarinn, the Borgunarbikarinn and the 2016–17 UEFA Champions League Second qualifying round for the first time in the club's history.

On 27 April Stjarnan won KR 1–0 in the Meistarakeppni KSÍ, an annual match between previous league winners and previous Icelandic cup winners.

First team

Transfers and loans

Transfers in

Transfers out

Loans out

Preseason

Fótbolti.net Cup
Stjarnan took part in the 2015 Fótbolti.net Cup, a pre-season tournament for clubs outside of Reykjavík.

The team played in Group 2 along with ÍBV, Grindavík and Keflavík. Stjarnan topped the group with 6 points after wins against ÍBV and Grindavík.

As winners of Group 2 Stjarnan went straight to the finals where they met Breiðablik. The game ended 2–1 for Breiðablik with Veigar Páll scoring Stjarnan's only goal.

Lengjubikarinn
Stjarnan played in Group 3 in the Icelandic league cup, Lengjubikarinn along with ÍA, Valur, Grindavík, Keflavík, Fjarðabyggð, Haukar and Þór.

After a draw against Valur and a defeat against ÍA in the first two rounds Stjarnan won their remaining five games and finished in 3rd place with 16 points. Stjarnan went through to the quarter-finals as the 3rd place team with the most points but they had already announced their withdrawal from the quarter-finals.

Meistarakeppni KSÍ
Stjarnan played the 2014 Borgunarbikarinn winners KR in the Meistarakeppni KSÍ, an annual match contested between the champions of the previous Úrvalsdeild season and the holders of the Borgunarbikarinn on 27 April 2015.

Stjarnan won the game 1–0 with Þórhallur Kári Knútsson scoring the winning goal in the 82nd minute.

Úrvalsdeild

League table

Matches

Summary of results

Points breakdown
 Points at home: 13
 Points away from home: 17
 6 Points: ÍBV, Fylkir, Keflavík
 4 Points: ÍA 
 3 Points: KR, Valur
 2 Points: Víkingur R
 1 Points: Leiknir R, FH, Fjölnir
 0 Points: Breiðablik

Borgunarbikarinn
Stjarnan came into the Icelandic cup, Borgunarbikarinn, in the 32nd-finals and were drawn against Leiknir Reykjavík. Stjarnan won the game after penalties. The game had ended 1–1. In the 16th-finals the team was drawn against Fylkir. Stjarnan played poorly and lost the game 3–0.

Champions League
Stjarnan came into the 2015-16 UEFA Champions League in the 2nd qualifying round.

On 7 July it was confirmed that Stjarnan would play Celtic in the second qualifying round for the 2015-16 UEFA Champions League.
Celtic F.C. won the first leg at home 2–0 after dominating for most of the game. In the second leg Stjarnan started well and scored a goal in the 7th minute through Ólafur Karl giving them a glimmer of hope in the tie but Celtic equalised on the 33rd minute and scored three more goals in the game winning the tie 6–1.

Second qualifying round

Statistics

Goalscorers
Includes all competitive matches.

Appearances
Includes all competitive matches.
Numbers in parentheses are sub appearances

Disciplinary record
Includes all competitive matches.

Squad stats
Includes all competitive matches; Úrvalsdeild, Borgunarbikar, Lengjubikar, Meistarakeppni KSÍ and UEFA Champions League.
{| class="wikitable" style="text-align:center;"
|-
!  style="background:#0000ff; color:white; width:150px;"|
!  style="background:#0000ff; color:white; width:75px;"|Úrvalsdeild
!  style="background:#0000ff; color:white; width:75px;"|Borgunarbikar
!  style="background:#0000ff; color:white; width:75px;"|Lengjubikar
!  style="background:#0000ff; color:white; width:75px;"|Meistarakeppni KSÍ
!  style="background:#0000ff; color:white; width:75px;"|Europe
!  style="background:#0000ff; color:white; width:75px;"|Total
|-
|align=left|Games played       || 22 || 2 || 7 || 1 || 2 || 34
|-
|align=left|Games won          || 9 || 1 || 5 || 1 || 0 || 16
|-
|align=left|Games drawn        || 6 || 0 || 1 || 0 || 0 || 7
|-
|align=left|Games lost         || 7 || 1 || 1 || 0 || 2 || 11
|-
|align=left|Goals scored       || 32 || 1 || 14 || 1 || 1 || 49
|-
|align=left|Goals conceded     || 24 || 4 || 5 || 0 || 6 || 39
|-
|align=left|Clean sheets       || 7 || 0 || 3 || 1 || 0 || 11
|-
|align=left|Yellow cards       || 35 || 3 || 12 || 1 || 2 || 53
|-
|align=left|Red cards         || 4 || 0 || 0 || 0 || 0 || 4
|-

External links
 Stjarnan Official Site
 Silfurskeiðin – Stjarnan Fan Site

References

Stjarnan